The Anthem is a music venue and auditorium in Washington, D.C. that opened in October 2017. With a capacity of 2,500 to 6,000, the venue is used for concerts, spanning a wide range of musical genres. The following is a list of concerts and music events that have been held at the venue.

Concerts

2017

2018

2019

2020

References

External links
 Events Calendar at The Anthem

American music-related lists
Lists of events in the United States
Entertainment events in the United States
Events in Washington, D.C.
Lists of concerts and performances by location
Lists of events by venue
Washington, D.C.-related lists